Chartley railway station was a former British railway station to serve the village of  Stowe-by-Chartley in Staffordshire.

It was opened by the Stafford and Uttoxeter Railway in 1867 and renamed Stowe in 1874 and also known as Chartley and Stowe. Passenger services finished in 1939.

The Stafford and Uttoxeter Railway was purchased for £100,000 by the Great Northern Railway in July 1881 and the line subsequently passed into LNER ownership with Railway Grouping in 1923.

In 1882, it was the scene of a serious accident.  A special train had been provided for the Meynell Hunt.  It left Derby Friargate with four horseboxes from GNR and the MS&LR plus three passenger carriages.  At Sudbury six North Staffordshire horseboxes were added after the first coach, which was behind the engine.  Thus only one vehicle was continuously braked. Although the driver was using care in approaching stations, he was being piloted by the fireman who knew the line, but not that the passing loop at Chartley had just been brought into use. The train approached Chartley at 30 to 35 miles an hour and the leading coach became derailed. This caused the horseboxes to strike the timber platform, causing severe damage, and several horses were killed or injured. None of the passengers or crew were hurt. The Inspecting Officer for the Board of Trade recommended that, in future, the facing points for all passing loops should be straight, with the "S" curve at the trailing end.

References

Further reading

Disused railway stations in Staffordshire
Former Great Northern Railway stations
Railway stations in Great Britain opened in 1867
Railway stations in Great Britain closed in 1939